Nicholas James Quested (Nick Drayson) (born 1953) is the Anglican Bishop of Northern Argentina.

Drayson was educated at Keble College, Oxford and Wycliffe Hall, Oxford. He was ordained an Anglican priest in 1979. Drayson began his career with the South American Mission Society (SAMS). He has also served in Andalucia and at Beverley Minster.

References

1953 births
Alumni of Wycliffe Hall, Oxford
Alumni of Keble College, Oxford
Living people
Anglican bishops of Northern Argentina
21st-century Anglican bishops in South America